Jeremy Richard Scott (born May 1, 1981) is an American pole vaulter from Norfolk, Nebraska.

Jeremy finished second at the 2012 US Olympic Trials, earning him a spot on the 2012 Olympic Team to compete in London.  He did not qualify for the pole vault final.

He finished sixth at the 2009 World Athletics Final. He also competed at the 2003 World Indoor Championships and the 2009 World Championships without reaching the final.

His personal best is 5.75 meters, achieved in June 2009 in Eugene. He has 5.82 meters on the indoor track, achieved in June 2009 in Jonesboro.

Scott graduated with honors from Allegheny College in 2003 with a degree in neuroscience. He earned a master's degree in exercise science from the University of Arkansas.

References

External links 
 
 
 
 
 

1981 births
Living people
American male pole vaulters
Athletes (track and field) at the 2011 Pan American Games
Athletes (track and field) at the 2012 Summer Olympics
Olympic track and field athletes of the United States
Arkansas Razorbacks men's track and field athletes
Pan American Games silver medalists for the United States
Pan American Games medalists in athletics (track and field)
Medalists at the 2011 Pan American Games